The 1977 Formula 750 season was the fifth season of the FIM Formula 750 World Championship and the first season to have full world championship status. Steve Baker was crowned champion, winning five races on aggregate.

Calendar

Notes:
1. - Heat two of the Daytona 200 was not run due to rain.
2. – Heat two of the Preis von Salzburg was abandoned due to rain.

Championship standings

References

See also
 1977 Grand Prix motorcycle racing season

Books
 

Formula 750
Formula 750